Charles Goldie may refer to:

 C. F. Goldie (Charles Frederick Goldie, 1870–1947), New Zealand artist
 Charles Goldie (cricketer) (1826–1886), English clergyman and cricketer